The Australian Football League stages the highest-level senior Australian rules football competition in the country. 

However, there has not been a league-wide Reserves competition since 1987, when the then-Victorian Football League expanded interstate to become the modern Australian Football League, with the AFL Reserves competition being shut down at the end of the 1999 season.

Since that time, AFL-listed players who have not been selected in their senior teams are made eligible to play in one of three state leagues: the Victorian Football League, the South Australian National Football League and the West Australian Football League. 

The system used to accommodate AFL-listed players within these leagues varies considerably from state to state.

Current affiliations 
For the 2023 season, the eighteen Australian Football League clubs will have the following Reserves arrangements.

Victorian clubs

Dedicated reserves competition (1919–1999)
From 1919 to 1981, the Victorian Football League was based solely in the state of Victoria. From 1919 to 1945, it operated two grades of competition (the seniors and Reserves), and from 1946 to 1981, three grades of competition (the seniors, Reserves, and Under-19s). 

Local players were primarily recruited via the league's metropolitan and country zoning rules, and the clubs had full ability to develop its players through its Under-19s and Reserves teams. This same basic structure was used consistently across all three of the elite leagues (the VFL, SANFL and the WAFL).

Three major factors between 1986 and 1991 led to the end of this traditional arrangement in Victoria:
 Firstly, the Victorian Football League expanded interstate and became the Australian Football League.
 Secondly, VFL/AFL proposals for West Coast and Adelaide to participate in the minor grades were rejected by the WAFL and SANFL, while Brisbane (a Queensland based club) fielded a Reserves team in 1989 to 1992 but did not field an Under-19s team.
 Thirdly, the inaugural national AFL Draft was held in 1986, and the Draft gradually replaced zoning as the primary means of recruitment to the national league, thus defeating the purpose of the developmental continuity between the Under-19, Reserves and senior grades.

As a result of these, the AFL agreed to relinquish direct control of the Victorian Reserves and Under-19 competitions to the newly formed Victorian State Football League at the end of the 1991 season. This also saw the AFL cease to be the governing body for football in Victoria after 95 years, while the Under-19s competition (and the twelve participating AFL clubs' under-19s teams) was shut down, to be replaced by the TAC Cup featuring six new independent district-based under-18s clubs.

The change to the Reserves competition was mostly administrative: while it became known as (and was governed by) the VSFL, it was otherwise identical to the 1919-1991 VFL/AFL Reserves, and is considered a direct continuation.

The VFL/AFL Reserves in 1919-1988 and the VSFL in 1993-1996 were contested by the traditional VFL clubs: at the end of 1996, Fitzroy had their AFL operations taken over by the Brisbane Bears, thus reducing the VSFL competition to eleven teams until 1999.

While the Sydney Swans continued to participate after South Melbourne's relocation at the end of 1981, and Brisbane participated in 1989-1992, none of the South Australian or Western Australian clubs ever competed.

Combination with the VFL (since 2000)
Following the 1999 season, the VSFL was merged into Victoria's second-tier senior football league, the Victorian Football League, which had been known as the Victorian Football Association  until 1995 (with a history dating back to 1877). Such a merger had first been proposed as early as 1980, and a formal attempt to enact the merger for the 1995 season was defeated after strong opposition from the clubs. 

Since the merger, the VFL has served as a hybrid second-tier senior competition and Reserves competition for AFL clubs. While the VFL also had its own Reserves competition, the VFL Development League, none of the eight Victorian AFL clubs who fielded a stand-alone team in the VFL seniors was ever involved in this League before it was shut down at the end of the 2018 season.

Since the merger, there have been four types of club participating in the VFL:
VFL/AFL club affiliations: in these cases, an AFL club enters into an agreement with a single VFL club (or, in some former cases, two VFL clubs). Any players listed at the AFL club are permitted to play with the VFL club on weekends when not selected for an AFL game. The VFL club maintains its own, separate playing list, and its weekly team is composed of a mixture of VFL-listed and AFL-listed players. The exact nature of the organisational relationship between the VFL and AFL club varies on a case-by-case basis, with some VFL sides enjoying reasonable autonomy, and others being heavily influenced by their AFL-affiliates.
Stand-alone AFL reserves teams: in these cases, the AFL club fields its own team in the VFL. Naturally, the AFL club has complete autonomy over the operation of its VFL team. Because the AFL list of 42 is not large enough to field two complete teams, the club must also maintain a separate list of "top-up players" who are eligible only for VFL games. The licence fee for any AFL club fielding a stand-alone reserves team is much higher than the cost of entering into an affiliation.
Stand-alone VFL senior clubs: in these cases, the VFL club has no affiliation with any AFL club. It takes complete responsibility for maintaining its own list of players from outside the AFL.
Players spread across all stand-alone VFL clubs: this option, which is similar to arrangements previously made in South Australia and Western Australia, was established from 2021 as an option for AFL clubs seeking cost savings in the wake of the COVID-19 pandemic.

Currently, there are no limitations on how many AFL-listed players may play in a VFL team on any given weekend, except during finals, when only players who have played a certain number of VFL games during the season are eligible. 

There was previously a rule known as the 12–10 Rule: this stated that in a match between an affiliated VFL team and a stand-alone VFL senior team, the affiliated team could play a maximum of twelve AFL-listed players with ten VFL-listed players: in the event the AFL club had more than twelve non-selected players available, the excess players would play in the VFL Reserves. This rule was abolished in 2011 after more AFL clubs decided to field stand-alone Reserves teams in the VFL.

Historical VFL/AFL affiliations by AFL club
For all clubs in this list, the club fielded a Reserves team in the VFL/AFL Reserves up to 1991, and then in the VSFL from 1992-1999. The Fitzroy Football Club also fielded a Reserves team in these competitions, until the club's playing operations were taken over by the Brisbane Bears at the end of 1996. 

This list shows all Reserves affiliations and arrangements since 2000:

2000–2002 and 2021-present – fielded a stand-alone reserves team in the VFL
2003–2019 – affiliated with the Northern Bullants/Blues
The Northern Bullants changed its nickname to Blues in the 2012 season

2000 and 2008-present – fielded a stand-alone reserves team in the VFL
2001–2007 – affiliated with the Williamstown Football Club

2000–2002 and 2013–present fielded a stand-alone reserves team in the VFL
2003–2012 – affiliated with the Bendigo Football Club
Bendigo changed its name from  Diggers to Bombers when the affiliation began in 2003, with the club changing its name the Bendigo Gold in 2012. Bendigo dropped out of the VFL and folded at the end of 2014

2000–present – fielded a stand-alone reserves team in the VFL

2000–present – affiliated with the Box Hill Football Club
Box Hill changed its nickname from Mustangs to Hawks when the affiliation was established

2000–2008 – affiliated with the Sandringham Football Club
2009–present – affiliated with the Casey Demons
The Casey Scorpions changed its nickname to Demons in 2017 

North Melbourne
2000–2002 – affiliated with the Murray Kangaroos Football Club, a new team established in joint-venture between the Kangaroos and the Ovens & Murray Football League; Murray Kangaroos dropped out and folded at the end of 2002
2003–2005 – affiliated with the Port Melbourne Football Club
2006–2007 – split-affiliation with the North Ballarat Football Club and the Tasmanian Devils Football Club
Tasmania went into recess at the end of 2008
2008–2015 – split-affiliation with the North Ballarat Football Club and the Werribee Football Club
North Ballarat went into recess at the end of 2015
2016-2017 – full affiliation with the Werribee Football Club
2018–present – fielded a stand-alone reserves team in the VFL

2000 and 2014–present – fielded a stand-alone reserves team in the VFL
2001–2013 – affiliated with the Coburg Football Club
Coburg changed its nickname from Lions to Tigers when the affiliation was established

2000 – fielded a stand-alone reserves team in the VFL
2001–2008 – affiliated with the Springvale/Casey Scorpions
The Springvale Scorpions relocated to Casey and became the Casey Scorpions in 2006
2009–present – affiliated with the Sandringham Football Club

Western Bulldogs
2000 – split-affiliation with the Werribee Football Club and the Williamstown Football Club
2001–2007 – affiliated with the Werribee Football Club
2008–2013 – affiliated with the Williamstown Football Club
2014–present – fielded a stand-alone reserves team, known as the Footscray Bulldogs, in the VFL

South Australian clubs

Historical arrangement
After  and  had entered the AFL in 1991 and 1997 respectively, South Australia had two AFL teams and a strong nine-team state league (the SANFL). Until 2013, the AFL clubs were affiliated with the entire SANFL, rather than with an individual club as is seen in Victoria; this meant that the reserves players from each AFL club would be dispersed throughout the SANFL, playing for different teams. This arrangement was governed by the annual "AFL–SANFL Interchange Agreement".

The method used to allocate players to the state league teams varied depending upon whether the player was from South Australia, or was from interstate:
Players from South Australia remained allocated to the SANFL clubs from which they were recruited: these players would originally have been allocated to their state league clubs as juniors under zoning rules.
Players from interstate were allocated to the SANFL clubs based on a "mini-draft": Each year, the pool of players available in the mini-draft consisted solely of AFL-listed players in their first pre-season with a South Australian club (including both of the AFL clubs), with the SANFL teams drafting players in reverse-finishing order from the previous season.

Regardless of which method was used to allocate the player, he typically remained allocated to the same SANFL for his entire career, although there were provisions in the rules for players to be re-allocated to a different club on a case-by-case basis to ensure that the AFL-listed players were given the appropriate opportunities to develop; e.g. an AFL club could seek a re-allocation for a developing key forward on its list if the player's opportunities were limited by the presence of an established key forward in his allocated team.

This arrangement, or a variation of it, was the mechanism for distribution of Reserves players in South Australia until 2013.

Current arrangement
In August 2013, the SANFL clubs agreed to allow  to enter a stand-alone reserves team into the SANFL senior competition as a tenth team.

Among the arrangements, Adelaide's reserves team were required to pay an annual $400,000 licence fee (which adjusts for inflation) and is dispersed amongst the remaining clubs, play most of its games as the away team, and does not wear the Adelaide Crows AFL guernsey. The team consists of Adelaide Crows players who are not selected for the AFL team, one permanently contracted former Crows player to serve in a leadership position, and young top-up players from other SANFL clubs or suburban competitions. The arrangement is in place for fifteen years.

The SANFL also agreed to permit  to use the Port Adelaide Magpies as a stand-alone reserves team. After Port Adelaide entered the AFL in 1997, the SANFL had established the Port Adelaide Magpies as a separate legal entity from the Port Adelaide club which participated in the AFL, with the clubs being reunified via an official merger in 2010, and since 2014 it has been Port Adelaide's reserves team. It is subject to the same playing conditions as Adelaide's reserves team, except for the fact it wears the traditional Port Adelaide Magpies guernsey and plays home games at Alberton Oval. 

In 2015, Port Adelaide fielded an academy team of father-son selections and international and interstate scholarship holders in the SANFL Reserves competition, as well as shutting down its traditional junior grade teams and surrendering its SANFL recruiting zones. 

At the end of the 2018 season, the club withdrew from the SANFL Reserves, while Port Adelaide and the SANFL mutually agreed to shut down the academy team.

Historical arrangements by club

1991–2013 – affiliated with the entire SANFL under the interchange agreement
2014–present – fielded a stand-alone reserves team in the SANFL

1997–2013 – affiliated with the entire SANFL under the interchange agreement
2014–present – fielded a stand-alone reserves team in the SANFL

Western Australian clubs

Historical arrangement
Like South Australia, Western Australia has two AFL clubs ( and ) and a strong ten-team state league (the West Australian Football League). Initially, the Western Australian AFL clubs were involved in a league affiliation with the WAFL, which functioned in the same way as the SANFL's league affiliation. From 1999 until 2001, both clubs established affiliations with a single WAFL club, similar to (and, in fact, pre-dating by one year) those seen in Victoria, and known locally as "host-club arrangements". 
After the three years, the WAFL clubs voted to end these arrangements, and returned to a league affiliation for the next twelve years with players playing with their junior WAFL clubs or host clubs for those who came from other states.

Current arrangement
Starting in 2011, the two AFL clubs started to push hard to end the league affiliation model; their preference was to field stand-alone reserves teams in the WAFL, but this was rejected by the WAFL clubs. In October 2012, after two years of negotiations, the clubs agreed to return to host-club arrangements – West Coast with East Perth and Fremantle with Peel Thunder – to commence from the 2014 season, with some transitional arrangements beginning in 2013. The original deal lasted for a minimum of five seasons.

After the five years of its agreement, West Coast and East Perth mutually agreed to dissolve their agreement, and West Coast were granted approval to field a stand-alone reserves team, which commenced playing the 2019 season.

Historical arrangements by club

1995–1998 – established and affiliated with the entire WAFL
1999 – affiliated in a host-club arrangement with the South Fremantle Football Club
2000–2013 – after the WAFL clubs voted to end host-club arrangements, returned to an affiliation with the entire WAFL.
2014–present – affiliated in a host-club arrangement with the Peel Thunder Football Club, with an agreement in place until at least 2021.

1987–1998: established and affiliated with the entire WAFL
1999: affiliated in a host-club arrangement with the Claremont Football Club
2000–2001: affiliated in a host-club arrangement with the East Perth Football Club
2002–2013: after the WAFL clubs voted to end host-club arrangements, returned to an affiliation with the entire WAFL.
2014–2018: affiliated in a host-club arrangement with the East Perth Football Club.
2019-present: fielded a stand-alone reserves team in the WAFL

New South Wales and Queensland clubs
In New South Wales and Queensland, all four AFL clubs field stand-alone reserves teams in the Victorian Football League.

Historical New South Wales and Queensland affiliations
Brisbane Bears
1987–1988 – affiliated with the entire QAFL
1989–1992 – fielded a reserves team in the VFL reserves/AFL reserves/VSFL competition
1993–1996 – returned to an affiliation with the entire QAFL

Brisbane Lions
1997 – affiliated with the entire QAFL
1998–2010 – fielded a stand-alone reserves team in the QAFL. The reserves team was initially known as the Lion Cubs, became known as the Suncoast Lions from 2004.
2011–2019 – fielded a stand-alone reserves team in the NEAFL (in the Northern Conference while it existed). The team was known as simply Brisbane Lions.
From 2021 – will field a stand-alone reserves team in the VFL.

2011–2019 – fielded a stand-alone reserves team in the NEAFL (in the Northern Conference while it existed).
From 2021 – will field a stand-alone reserves team in the VFL.

2012–2019 – fielded a stand-alone reserves team in the NEAFL (in the Eastern Conference while it existed). The team was originally known as the University of Western Sydney (UWS) Giants, then the Western Sydney University Giants, in acknowledgment a broad partnership between the football club and the university (which changed its name in 2016), and then finally as simply Greater Western Sydney Giants; from a football perspective the UWS Giants team is entirely managed by GWS as a stand-alone team.
From 2021 – will field a stand-alone reserves team in the VFL.

Until 1981 – based in Melbourne and known as the South Melbourne Football Club, fielded a reserves team in the VFL reserves.
1982–1999 – the senior team relocated to Sydney, and continued to field a reserves team in the VFL reserves/AFL reserves/VSFL.
2000–2002 – partially affiliated with the Port Melbourne Football Club in the VFL, and also fielded a stand-alone reserves team known as the Redbacks in the Sydney AFL. In practice, Port Melbourne served as a reserves affiliation for up to six experienced players, and the Redbacks served as a development team for inexperienced players.
2003–2010 – fielded a stand-alone reserves team in AFL Canberra.
2011–2019 – fielded a stand-alone reserves team in the NEAFL (in the Eastern Conference while it existed).
From 2021 – will field a stand-alone reserves team in the VFL.

Push towards stand-alone reserves teams in the 2000s
Starting in around 2011, there was considerable interest by many AFL clubs in abandoning league affiliations or host-club arrangements to form stand-alone reserves teams. 

A large contributing factor to this interest was the perception that the developmental autonomy  and  enjoyed as the only two clubs fielding stand-alone reserves teams in the VFL was responsible for the very strong senior AFL performances of those two clubs between 2007 and 2011, during which time they won four of the five AFL premierships. 

From 2003 to 2007, Geelong had won 67 of 118 AFL matches despite being the only AFL club to maintain a standalone VFL team in this time, or continually since the dissolution of the AFL Reserves competition at the end of 1999. 

In Victoria, some VFL clubs with a strong existing identity were also interested in ending their AFL affiliations after the strong performance of stand-alone VFL side Port Melbourne in its unbeaten 2011 season.

This represented a shift from the prevailing thinking of the 1990s when the affiliations were arranged. At that time, particularly during the early 1990s recession, many clubs' finances were tight, so operating costs drove many decisions. 

At that time, some Victorian AFL clubs favoured the establishment of a WAFL/SANFL style of affiliation, with reserves players scattered throughout the VFL, because it would result in minimum management costs for these AFL clubs. The desire for teams to re-establish stand-alone reserves teams came at a time when most clubs were in a much stronger financial position. The total licence and running costs for a stand-alone team were estimated to be $500,000 per year in 2011. 

Through the 2000s, the AFL preferred that its Victorian clubs retained VFL-affiliations, and offered a disincentive in the form of an inflated licence fee for fielding a stand-alone team; however, the AFL did not otherwise prevent teams from fielding stand-alone reserves teams if they are willing and able to pay the fee.

In South Australia and Western Australia, the debate became more heated than in Victoria: the league affiliation system primarily benefited the state leagues, by helping to ensure that none of their clubs gained an undue advantage through preferential access to professional AFL-listed players, and by helping to minimise the drain of talent from the league, but this was to the detriment of player development at the AFL clubs, since reserves players end up playing for a variety of different teams, under a variety of different game-plans, and not necessarily in the positions that the AFL clubs would prefer.

As early as 1988 - the West Coast Eagles' second season in the VFL/AFL - senior coach John Todd proposed that the Eagles enter a team in the Reserves competition, but the West Australian Football Commission point-blank rejected his proposal.

From 2011, Adelaide, Port Adelaide, Fremantle and West Coast actively sought to establish stand-alone reserves teams. There was considerable opposition from the SANFL and WAFL clubs about including these reserves teams in the state leagues, with these clubs concerned about the impact this would have on depth of talent, league competitiveness, gate takings, and the existing club's viability: consequently, both the WAFL and SANFL on several occasions outright rejected any proposal which would see any AFL club's reserves team competing in those leagues.

In Western Australia, a wide range of compromise solutions was proposed, including stand-alone reserves teams playing the WAFL clubs in a separate competition during their WAFL bye weeks, a new secondary league including reserves teams from the Western Australian and South Australian AFL clubs, or a return to host-club arrangements. In October 2012, the Western Australian clubs reached a compromise, with two WAFL clubs, Peel and East Perth, forming host club arrangements with Fremantle and West Coast. 

In 2017, East Perth and West Coast mutally agreed to dissolve this arrangement, with West Coast fielding a WAFL team since 2019, with the arrangement between Peel and Fremantle remaining in place as of 2022.

In South Australia, Adelaide announced its intention to establish a stand-alone reserves team, but maintained that it would not enter it in the SANFL without full support from all SANFL clubs.  However, with the reversal of Norwood's publicly stated opposition to AFL stand-alone involvement, the SANFL gained the constitutionally required two-thirds majority support in August 2013: despite failing to obtain the support of either South Adelaide or Central District, Adelaide has fielded a reserves side in the SANFL senior level since 2014 (except 2020).

Port Adelaide's situation remained unresolved at the time, since it wanted to operate the Port Adelaide Magpies SANFL team as its host club in the SANFL seniors. This desire had led to an impasse, as the South Australian Football Commission required that Port Adelaide shut down its Under-18s and Under-16s teams and surrender its SANFL recruiting zones, thereby severing its connection with the community, in order to continue with this arrangement, which the club was highly reluctant to do. 

Subsequently, a compromise deal was made with the SANFL: in exchange for the club shutting down its Under-18s and Under-16s teams and surrendering its SANFL recruiting zones, they could continue the arrangement, with the club being granted permission to field an academy team in the SANFL Reserves competition. At the end of the 2018 SANFL season, Port Adelaide withdrew from the Reserves competition, with Port Adelaide and the SANFL mutally agreeing to shut down the academy team.

Other notes
In 2020, AFL-listed players were not permitted to compete in state-level football in any capacity due to the requirements of the quarantine bubbles set up to complete the 2020 AFL season amidst the COVID-19 pandemic. 

As a result, all of the affiliations in this page were suspended during the season.

AFL Women's reserves arrangements 
In 2017 the AFL Women's (AFLW) competition was launched, with semi-professional female footballers gaining the opportunity to compete in a national league.

For 2021 and 2022, most female state leagues and local competitions were aligned with the length of the AFLW season: this situation ended with the AFLW changing its season to run between August and November in Season 7 (the second season in 2022).

The current situation for AFLW-listed players not selected for their senior team is as follows:

See also

New South Wales Australian Football League
North East Australian Football League
Northern Territory Football League
Queensland Australian Football League
South Australian National Football League
Tasmanian Football League
Victorian Football League
West Australian Football League
National Rugby League reserves affiliations

References

Australian Football League
South Australian National Football League
West Australian Football League
Victorian Football League
 *